Ronell Langston Plasschaert (born 16 April 1992), known professionally as Ronnie Flex, is a Dutch hip hop performer and rapper.

Career 
Plasschaert started making music at a young age. In 2012, he got his first hit in the Netherlands with his song "Soldaatje", which he made with fellow rapper Mr. Polska. On 20 March 2013, Plasschaert released his first solo single, "Tankstation", which reached the 100th place in the Dutch Single Top 100. He released his debut album De nacht is nog jong, net als wij voor altijd on 14 November 2014. Plasschaert then released several singles, including "Drank & Drugs", a song made in collaboration with fellow rapper Lil' Kleine, which achieved first place in the Single Top 100 and remained in the chart for a total of 35 weeks.

Plasschaert took part on the 16th season of the television series Expeditie Robinson in September 2015. Since 2018, he has been a member of the judging panel on the television program It Takes 2. In June of that year, in collaboration with BLØF, Plasschaert released the single "Omarm me". On 12 July, he released a remix of the song "Wine Slow" in collaboration with Idaly, Famke Louise and Bizzey.

In October 2018, Plasschaert launched his own clothing line in collaboration with clothing company CoolCat.

In 2022, he appeared in the television show The Masked Singer.

Personal life 
Plasschaert had a relationship with Famke Louise from mid-2018, until early-2019. They announced their relationship in their Christmas song "Alleen door jou". Plasschaert has a daughter with his ex-girlfriend DJ Wef.

Discography

Albums

Singles

References

External links 
 
 

1992 births
Living people
21st-century Dutch male singers
21st-century Dutch singers
Dutch hip hop musicians
Dutch people of Surinamese descent